Charles Virgil Eikenberg (February 22, 1924 – January 30, 1987) was an American football quarterback in the National Football League. He played for the Chicago Cardinals. He played college football for the Louisville Cardinals and Rice Owls.

References

1924 births
1987 deaths
American football quarterbacks
Chicago Cardinals players
Louisville Cardinals football players
Rice Owls football players